In physics, a pair potential is a function that describes the potential energy of two interacting objects solely as a function of the distance between them.  Examples of pair potentials include the Coulomb's law in electrodynamics, Newton's law of universal gravitation in mechanics, and the Lennard-Jones potential and the Morse potential in computational chemistry.  

Pair potentials are very common in physics and computational chemistry and biology; exceptions are very rare.  An example of a potential energy function that is not a pair potential is the three-body Axilrod-Teller potential. Another example is the Stillinger-Weber potential for silicon, which includes the angle in a triangle of silicon atoms as an input parameter.

References

Mechanics
Electricity
Computational chemistry
Intermolecular forces
Quantum mechanical potentials
Theoretical chemistry